The Zagaje Formation is an Early Jurassic Epoch (Hettangian-Sinemurian) geologic formation located mostly in Poland with layers also exposed in north Germany. This unit is known for its diverse Ichnofossil assemblages, with traces of invertebrates along vertebrate footprints. Indeterminate fossil ornithischian tracks, of the Hettangian Stage, have been reported from the formation. The Zagaje Formation correlates with The lower part of the Höganäs Formation in Scania, as well the  Munkerup Member and the Gassum Formation in Denmark.

See also 
 
 List of stratigraphic units with indeterminate ornithischian tracks

References

Bibliography 
  

Geologic formations of Poland
Hettangian Stage
Early Jurassic Europe
Jurassic System of Europe
Sandstone formations
Mudstone formations
Deltaic deposits
Fluvial deposits
Lacustrine deposits
Ichnofossiliferous formations
Paleontology in Poland